Egvad Parish is a parish in the Diocese of Ribe in Ringkøbing-Skjern Municipality, Denmark.

References 

Parishes of Denmark